Walter Graham may refer to:
 Walter D. Graham, American football player
 Walter Hodgson Bevan Graham, British Royal Navy officer
 Watty Graham, Irish Presbyterian and member of the Society of the United Irishmen